Pea Ridge is a city in Benton County, Arkansas, United States. The name Pea Ridge is derived from a combination of the physical location of the original settlement of the town, across the crest of an Ozark Mountains ridge, and for the hog peanuts or turkey peas that had been originally cultivated by Native American tribes centuries before European settlement, which later helped to provide basic subsistence once those pioneer settlers arrived.

The site of the battle is preserved as the Pea Ridge National Military Park.

The town's downtown business district is on the National Register of Historic Places and largely comprises commercial structures from the late 19th and early 20th centuries. The population of Pea Ridge was 4,794 at the 2010 census, which was a 104.3 percent increase over the 2000 census number of 2,346. It is part of the Northwest Arkansas region. The local weekly newspaper is the Times of Northeast Benton County.

Geography
Pea Ridge is located in northern Benton County at  (36.447822, -94.116691). Arkansas Highway 94 is the main road through the city, leading south  to the center of Rogers and northwest  to the Missouri border. Arkansas Highway 72 leads east  to U.S. Route 62 at Pea Ridge National Military Park, and southwest  to Bentonville.

Demographics

2020 census

As of the 2020 United States census, there were 6,559 people, 2,021 households, and 1,455 families residing in the city.

2010 census
As of the 2010 Census, Pea Ridge had a population of 4,794.  The racial and ethnic composition of the population was 90.7% white, 0.7% African American, 0.9% Native American, 0.3% Asian, 2.0% from two or more races and 5.8% Hispanic or Latino.

There were 1300 households, out of which 37.3% had children under the age of 18 living with them, 63.3% were married couples living together, 7.8% had a female householder with no husband present, and 24.1% were non-families. 21.6% of all households were made up of individuals, and 12.0% had someone living alone who was 65 years of age or older.  The average household size was 2.63 and the average family size was 3.05.

In the city, the population was spread out, with 26.9% under the age of 18, 6.9% from 18 to 24, 29.5% from 25 to 44, 21.6% from 45 to 64, and 15.1% who were 65 years of age or older.  The median age was 36 years.  For every 100 females, there were 95.7 males.  For every 100 females age 18 and over, there were 93.5 males.

The median income for a household in the city was $37,244, and the median income for a family was $42,222. Males had a median income of $29,340 versus $21,298 for females. The per capita income for the city was $15,149.  7.7% of the population and 6.0% of families were below the poverty line.  Out of the total population, 9.9% of those under the age of 18 and 7.6% of those 65 and older were living below the poverty line.

Education
Most of Pea Ridge is zoned to the Pea Ridge School District. A small section is zoned to Rogers Public Schools. Pea Ridge High School is the comprehensive high school of the former.

See also
 Battle of Pea Ridge

References

External links
 City of Pea Ridge official website
 Encyclopedia of Arkansas History & Culture entry: Pea Ridge (Benton County)

 
Cities in Benton County, Arkansas
Cities in Arkansas
Northwest Arkansas
American Civil War sites
Populated places established in 1850
1850 establishments in Arkansas